GDO may refer to:
 Godoberi language
 Gordon railway station, Sydney, in Australia
 Grid dip oscillator
 Guasdualito Airport, in Venezuela